Tamás Homonnay (2 January 1926 – 30 May 2013) was a Hungarian athlete. He competed in the men's pole vault at the 1952 Summer Olympics.

References

1926 births
2013 deaths
Athletes (track and field) at the 1952 Summer Olympics
Hungarian male pole vaulters
Olympic athletes of Hungary
Place of birth missing